The 1978 Railway Cup Hurling Championship was the 52nd staging of the Railway Cup since its establishment by the Gaelic Athletic Association in 1927. The cup began on 16 April 1978 and ended on 7 May 1978.

Leinster were the defending champions.

On 7 May 1978, Munster won the cup following a 2-13 to 1-11 defeat of Leinster in the final. This was their 33rd Railway Cup title overall and their first title since 1976.

Results

Semi-finals

Final

Scoring statistics

Top scorers overall

Bibliography

 Donegan, Des, The Complete Handbook of Gaelic Games (DBA Publications Limited, 2005).

References

Railway Cup Hurling Championship
Railway Cup Hurling Championship
Hurling